Patrícia Segala (born 8 May 1976) is a Brazilian former professional tennis player.

Segala competed on the professional tour in the 1990s and reached a career high singles ranking of 350 in the world, with two ITF titles to her name. In 1993 she qualified for the main draw of the WTA Tour tournament in Curitaba. She was a member of Brazil's 1995 Fed Cup team, appearing in four ties. From her four singles rubbers she was the winner in one, against Chile's Bárbara Castro.

ITF finals

Singles: 4 (2–2)

Doubles: 2 (0–2)

References

External links
 
 
 

1976 births
Living people
Brazilian female tennis players
20th-century Brazilian women
21st-century Brazilian women